John "Jack" Phelan (June 14, 1954 – July 20, 2020) was an American college basketball coach. He served as the University of Hartford's men's head coach from 1981 to 1992 and compiled an overall record of 128–181. Phelan oversaw the transition of the program from an NCAA Division II program into Division I. His previous coaching stops included Niagara University, Saint Francis University, and Fairfield University.

As a player, Phelan suited up for the Saint Francis Red Flash after a high school career at Northwest Catholic High School in West Hartford, Connecticut. He scored a Stokes Fieldhouse record 42 points in his senior season against Duquesne. Phelan was chosen in the sixth round of the 1977 NBA Draft by the Golden State Warriors, although he never played in the league.

After stepping down as Hartford's head coach in 1992, Phelan went into private consulting. He eventually became a high school athletics administrator at Farmington High School in Connecticut.

References

1954 births
2020 deaths
American men's basketball coaches
American men's basketball players
Basketball coaches from Connecticut
Basketball players from Connecticut
Fairfield Stags men's basketball coaches
Golden State Warriors draft picks
Hartford Hawks men's basketball coaches
Niagara Purple Eagles men's basketball coaches
People from West Hartford, Connecticut
Saint Francis Red Flash men's basketball coaches
Saint Francis Red Flash men's basketball players
Sportspeople from Hartford County, Connecticut